The Madman is a 1911 silent film short produced by the Essanay Studios and distributed by the General Film Company. The film is preserved in the BFI National Archive.

Cast
Francis X. Bushman as The Madman
Harry Cashman as The Warden
Frank Dayton as  The Butler
Charles Hitchcock as an Official
William Walters as The Guard
Bryant Washburn as A Balloonist

See also
Francis X. Bushman filmography

References

External links
 The Madman at IMDb.com

1911 films
Essanay Studios films
American silent short films
1911 short films
American black-and-white films
Silent American drama films
1911 drama films
1910s American films